The Bhogpur railway station is situated in Bhogpur in the district of Purba Medinipur in West Bengal in the South Eastern Railway Zone, India. The station lies between Howrah and Kharagpur. Special EMU trains are available here, and local EMU trains Howrah–Panskura, Howrah–Balichak, Howrah–Kharagpur, Howrah–Medinipur, Howrah–Haldia stop here. Also a few MEMU and passenger trains are available here, MEMU trains to TATA, BELDA are available here. Also trains to Digha and Puri also stop here. One pair of Santragachi–Digha and Mecheda–Digha trains are available here. The station has four platforms.

Approximately 15 villages use this station. people use this station to reach Kolkata. Local trains take 1.5 hours to reach to Howrah station. This station is in between Nandaigazan and Naryan pakuriya Murail Rail station. Panskura and Mecheda are large rail stations situated near this station. The first train to Howrah is at 3.09 am and last train to Howrah is 11.44 pm. The first train to Kharagpur is at 3.54 am and last is at 1.41 am.

References

External links 
 The station map of Bhogpur railway station

Railway stations in Purba Medinipur district
Kolkata Suburban Railway stations